California is a station on the Chicago Transit Authority's 'L' system, serving the Green Line's Lake Branch. It opened on November 6, 1893. California closed on February 9, 1992, as part of a series of budget cuts, but later reopened with the completion of the Green Line rehabilitation.

The station is situated at the intersection of California Avenue and Lake Street in the East Garfield Park neighborhood. It is wheel-chair accessible. It is also close to the Chicago Center for Green Technology.

Bus connections
CTA
 94 California

Notes and references

Notes

References

External links 
 California (Lake Street Line) Station Page
Mozart Street closed entrance from Google Maps Street View
California Avenue entrance from Google Maps Street View

CTA Green Line stations
Railway stations in the United States opened in 1893